Jean-Luc Godard was a French-Swiss film director, screenwriter and film editor whose career spanned nearly seventy years. He directed, wrote, produced and edited many films. The following attempts to be a comprehensive filmography.

Early short films (1955–1959)

French New Wave (1959–1967)

Feature films

Short films

Dziga Vertov Group/political films (1968–1972) 
Although Godard and Jean-Pierre Gorin were the principal creative forces behind these films, they usually went without on-screen credit. Most of the films from this time period were credited to the Dziga Vertov Group collective.

Transitional period (SonImage) (1974–1978)

Second Wave (1979–1988)

Feature films

Short films/videos

1989–2023

Feature and medium length films

Short films, video work

Other filmography

Other works

References

External links 
 

Godard, Jean-Luc

Godard, Jean-Luc

fr:Jean-Luc Godard#Filmographie